The Michigan was a brass era automobile built in Kalamazoo, Michigan by the Michigan Automobile Company, Ltd from 1903 to 1907.

History 
The Fuller brothers, Charles D. and Frank D. owned the Fuller Brothers Manufacturing Company that made washboards and other wood products. Negotiating with the Blood brothers, owners of the Kalamazoo Cycle Company and builders of a prototype car,they decided to go into automobile manufacturing.  On December, 30th, 1902, they established the Michigan Automobile Company, LTD, Charles Fuller as chairman, Frank Fuller as secretary and general manager, Maurice E. Blood as treasurer, and Charles C. Blood as superintendent.

A business dispute resulted in the Blood brothers leaving the company at the end of 1904. The Bloods set up production of their own car and the Blood automobile was identical with the last car they developed for Michigan.

The Bloods quit building automobiles (for a decade) in 1905 and built automobile parts instead. The Michigan was continued into 1907 when the Fuller brothers followed the Bloods into automobile parts. As Fuller and Sons Manufacturing Company, they made transmissions and clutches.

Models
The Bloods small prototype car, was a two-passenger runabout with a wheelbase of just 48 in., a steering lever and an air-cooled, single-cylinder engine that delivered 3.5 horsepower. For production, a longer frame with a wheelbase of 54 in. was used.  It was marketed as the Model A runabout, priced at $450 and weighing only 360 pounds.  About 100 cars were built by 1904.

A larger car, Model C, was added in 1904. It had a 2-cylinder engine that developed 12 hp, a wheelbase of 78 in., a  steering wheel but the engine still placed under the seat. Available as a Light Touring, similar to a detachable Tonneau, the price was $900.

The Bloods designed two more 2-cylinder cars that were introduced in 1905.  Model D with the 12 hp engine, wheelbase of 80 in. and Demi Tonneau body was priced at $1,100.  For $150 more, a larger Model E was offered with 16 hp engine, and a 90 in.wheelbase.  From 1906, Model E remained available priced at $1,500 until end of production in 1907.

See also
 Brass Era car
 List of defunct United States automobile manufacturers
 Michigan Model A at Conceptcarz.com

References

Defunct motor vehicle manufacturers of the United States
American companies established in 1903
Vehicle manufacturing companies established in 1903
1903 establishments in Michigan
Vehicle manufacturing companies disestablished in 1908
1908 disestablishments in Michigan
Companies based in Kalamazoo, Michigan
Motor vehicle manufacturers based in Michigan
Brass Era vehicles
1900s cars
Cars introduced in 1903